Giuseppe Mazzarelli (born 14 August 1972) is a former Swiss footballer who played as a defender.

During his career he played for FC Zürich, Manchester City F.C., Grasshopper Club Zürich, FC St. Gallen, A.S. Bari and FC Baden. He earned 12 caps for the Switzerland national football team.

References

External links
 
 FC Zurich stats

1972 births
Living people
People from Uster
Association football defenders
Expatriate footballers in Italy
Expatriate footballers in England
Swiss expatriate footballers
Swiss expatriate sportspeople in England
Swiss expatriate sportspeople in Italy
Swiss men's footballers
Switzerland international footballers
Premier League players
Serie A players
Serie B players
FC Zürich players
Manchester City F.C. players
Grasshopper Club Zürich players
FC St. Gallen players
S.S.C. Bari players
FC Baden players
Sportspeople from the canton of Zürich